The Ukrainian League Cup was a knockout cup competition in Ukrainian football, run by the Professional Football League of Ukraine. The tournament was organized to supplement the 2009–10 Ukrainian Second League season. The winner of the tournament received the Umbro League Cup.

History
Previously, in 1999 there was created a somewhat similar tournament, Ukrainian Second League Cup, that would qualify its winner and finalist for the national cup (Ukrainian Cup), but after the 2000–01 season it was discontinued.

Format
The format of this competition fluctuated insignificantly. It consisted of a qualification round that was followed by the first round, 1/16 of the final. Initially all rounds from the first to the semi-finals consisted of two games, on a home-away basis; later it changed with only one game played from the randomly chosen field of the participating clubs. Mainly the competition was limited to clubs that were competing in the Second League. Later, semifinalists were allowed to enter the Ukrainian Cup. The winner and runner-up of the competition were awarded a qualification to the Ukrainian Cup in 2000 and 2001.

First edition
In the 2009–10 season, the Cup began with a group tournament where teams from the 2009–10 Ukrainian Second League and amateur level competitors participated. At this stage all 24 teams were divided into eight groups. The best two teams out of each group advanced to the next round of the competition (Second Round) while all the last placed participants were eliminated. In the second round teams were paired with each other with the winners of each group playing at home. The winner of each pair advanced to the next round (quarter-finals). The quarter-finals took place in the same manner. These semi-finals consisted of two home-away matches, while the final took place at a neutral field. The winners of this competition were awarded the cup and the prize money (150,000 hryvnia) from Umbro, the general sponsor of the event.

Finals

Performance by club

See also 
 Football in Ukraine
 Ukrainian Premier League

External links 

 
League Cup
Defunct football competitions in Ukraine
Cup
2009 establishments in Ukraine
2010 disestablishments in Ukraine
National association football league cups